Lukáš Lacko (born 3 November 1987) is a former professional Slovak tennis player. His career-high ATP singles ranking is World No. 44, achieved in January 2013.

Tennis career

Juniors
As a junior Lacko compiled a singles win–loss record of 88–39, reaching as high as No. 3 in the combined junior world rankings in February 2005.

Junior Grand Slam results:

Australian Open: QF (2005)
French Open: SF (2005)
Wimbledon: 1R (2004)
US Open: 2R (2005)

Professional tour
At the 2010 Australian Open, he lost in the second round to World No. 2 and defending champion Rafael Nadal 2–6, 2–6, 2–6.

At the 2010 French Open, he played and won the longest match of his career in the first round against American Michael Yani with the score at 6–4, 6–7, 6–7, 7–6, 12–10. The 4-hour, 56-minutes match stretched over the course of two days, and tied the record for the most games played in the Open Era at the French Open.
Lacko continued his second round streak in 2010 majors by defeating the 24th seed Marcos Baghdatis in four sets. He then lost a very tight five set second round match against Jérémy Chardy.
He played in the 2010 Atlanta Tennis Championships and upset former World No.1 Lleyton Hewitt 6–2, 6–4 to advance to the quarterfinals.
At the 2011 Qatar Open, he lost in the second round to Rafael Nadal, despite achieving the rare feat of winning a bagel set against Nadal.

He reached his first singles ATP final in Zagreb 2012, where he lost to Mikhail Youzhny in straight sets.  At the 2012 Summer Olympics, he lost in the first round in the men's singles, and in the first round of the men's doubles with Martin Kližan.
At the 2014 French Open he lost in the first round to Roger Federer.

Lacko reached his second career ATP final at the 2018 Eastbourne International losing to Mischa Zverev.

In October 2022, he announced that 2022 might be his last season.

ATP Tour career finals

Singles: 2 (2 runner-ups)

Doubles: 1 (1 runner-up)

ATP Challenger and ITF Futures finals

Singles: 40 (22–18)

Doubles: 9 (5–4)

Performance timelines

Singles
Current through the 2022 Australian Open.

Doubles

References

External links
 
 
 
 
 
 

1987 births
Living people
Slovak male tennis players
Sportspeople from Piešťany
Tennis players at the 2012 Summer Olympics
Olympic tennis players of Slovakia